Fresno Pacific University (FPU) is a private Christian university in Fresno, California. It was founded as the Pacific Bible Institute in 1944 by the Pacific District Conference of Mennonite Brethren Churches. The university awarded its first Bachelor of Arts degree in 1965. The first master's degree program was introduced in 1975.

History
At the time of its founding, Pacific Bible Institute was located in a large home at 1095 N. Van Ness Ave. There were five staff members and twenty-eight students.  By the time the first school year was finished, a former YWCA building at the corner of Tuolumne and L streets (originally designed by Julia Morgan) had been purchased, and the next school year began in this building.

By 1958, land was purchased for the construction of the current campus near the corner of Butler and Chestnut, along with the Mennonite Brethren Biblical Seminary and the new Butler Avenue Mennonite Brethren Church.  Construction began on a new classroom building that year, and two dormitory buildings one year later.  The classroom building was ready for use in the fall of 1959, but the dorm buildings were not completed until 1961 because of financial difficulties.

The Bible Institute became an accredited junior college in 1961, and decided to develop a four-year program two years later, in 1963.  In 1964, Pacific Bible Institute changed its name to Pacific College, and became accredited with the WASC the next year.  By 1967, the decision was made to add graduate courses, and the accreditation for the first master of arts program was received from WASC in 1975. The college changed its name to Fresno Pacific College in 1976 and to Fresno Pacific University in 1997.

In 2010 the Mennonite Brethren Biblical Seminary became a part of the university, and changed its name to Fresno Pacific University Biblical Seminary.

The university was granted an exception to Title IX in 2015 which allows it to legally discriminate against LGBT students. Same-sex sexual activity by students is considered grounds for removal from campus. The school considers gay marriage to be anti-Christian.

Chief executives

1944–1946 Sam W. Goossen – Acting President/Dean
1946–1947 George B. Huebert – Administrator
1947–1953 George W. Peters – President/Dean
1953–1954 Rueben M. Baerg – Acting President
1954–1955 Rueben M. Baerg – Acting President, one-half year; Administrative Committee last half of year, Dr. George W. Peters, Chmn.
1955–1960 B.J. Braun – President
1960–1961 Arthur J. Wiebe – Director of Pacific Bible Institute; Mr. Joel A. Wiebe – Interim Director
1961–1975 Arthur J. Wiebe – President
1975–1976 Edmund Janzen, Chairman, Presidential Council
1976–1982 Edmund Janzen – President
1982–1983 Silas Bartsch – Interim President; Edmund Janzen on leave
1983–1985 Edmund Janzen – President
1985–1997 Richard Kriegbaum – President
1997–2000 Allen Carden – President
2000–2002 Harold Haak – President
2002–2012 D. Merrill Ewert – President
2012–2014 Pete Menjares – President
2014–2017 Richard Kriegbaum — President
2017–2022 Joseph Jones — President 
2022−present André Stephens – President

Academics
Fresno Pacific offers bachelor's degrees in more than 40 fields with over 100 areas of study. It also offers advanced degrees or credentials in four areas: Education, Individualized Master of Arts, MBA, Leadership & Organizational Studies and Peacemaking & Conflict Studies. The university is organized into five schools: The School of Business; the School of Education; the School of Humanities, Religion and Social Sciences; the School of Natural Sciences; and the School of Biblical Seminary. Fresno Pacific is accredited by the WASC Senior College and University Commission.

Graduation guarantee

In February 2009 Fresno Pacific University began offering a "Four Year Graduation Guarantee." FPU already has the highest four-year graduation rate in the Central Valley, with 60 percent of traditional undergraduate students already graduating in four years, compared to 12–15 percent in the CSU system.

The university will guarantee graduation within four years to qualified students entering the traditional undergraduate program. The guarantee is limited to basic graduation requirements for a single major with no minor. Transfer, degree completion and graduate students are not part of the guarantee.

Student responsibilities include:
Sign up for the guarantee during the freshman year, choose a major by the second semester of the freshman year and keep that major until graduation.
Make course plans with their adviser, follow those plans and meet all advising, registration and financial aid deadlines.
Complete at least 32 units per year with passing grades in each course and remain in good standing behaviorally.

Campuses
Fresno Pacific University's main 50-acre campus is located in the south east area of Fresno, hub of the Central Valley region of California and the fifth largest city in the state.

The university also maintains four regional campuses in Central California:
 Merced Regional Campus
 North Fresno Regional Campus
 Visalia Regional Campus
 Bakersfield Regional Campus

Buildings

Athletics

The Fresno Pacific athletic teams are called the Sunbirds. The university is a member of the Division II level of the National Collegiate Athletic Association (NCAA), primarily competing in the Pacific West Conference (PacWest) for most of its sports since the 2012–13 academic year. while its men's and women's water polo teams compete in the Western Water Polo Association (WWPA). The Sunbirds previously competed in the Golden State Athletic Conference (GSAC) of the National Association of Intercollegiate Athletics (NAIA) from 1986–87 to 2011–12.

Fresno Pacific competes in 17 intercollegiate varsity sports: Men's sports include baseball, basketball, cross country, soccer, swimming, tennis, track & field and water polo; while women's sports include basketball, cheerleading, cross country, soccer, swimming, tennis, track & field, volleyball and water polo.

Mascot
The athletics mascot is Sunny the Sunbird. Sunny is a much loved figure in the campus community.

Traditions

 The Wittenberg Door, a board located in the atrium of Steinert Campus Center, near the entrance to the dining room, is a place for the exchange of ideas. People are free to post expressions of their views, but are asked to write pieces in a charitable spirit and to include the writer's name. It was built in approximately 1983 and the original version was located in Alumni Hall when it still served as the campus cafeteria. A new board was built in 2004 and the old one was dismantled. The Mennonite Brethren Biblical Seminary has a board with the same name and purpose outside the B.C. Lounge.
 The Mennonite Central Committee holds its annual West Coast Relief Sale and Auction on the campus during the first weekend in April, at approximately 4:00 p.m.9:00 p.m. Friday and 7:00 a.m.3:00 p.m. Saturday. Ethnic foods, used books, antiques, plants, world crafts and quilts are all sold on campus in various booths and auction events.
 University Family Thanksgiving Meal
 Winter Formal

Notable alumni

 Ron Adams, 3-time NBA champion assistant coach for the Golden State Warriors
 Pablo Campos, professional soccer player and MLS champion with Real Salt Lake
 Malcolm Griffin, professional basketball player
 Dan Quisenberry, former Major League Baseball all-star pitcher for the Kansas City Royals
 Chris Schwinden, former Major League Baseball pitcher for the New York Mets
 Joshua Urbiztondo professional basketball player (PBA)
 Joey Wells, head women's basketball coach at Indiana State University

References

Further reading
 Toews, Paul, ed. Mennonite Idealism and Higher Education: The Story of the Fresno Pacific College Idea. Fresno, Calif.: The Center for Mennonite Brethren Studies, 1995. .
 Wiebe, Joel. Remembering...Reaching: A Vision of Service, a Fifty Year History of Fresno Pacific College. Fresno, Calif.: Fresno Pacific College, 1994. .

External links
 Official website
 Official athletics website

 
Education in Fresno, California
Private universities and colleges in California
Universities and colleges in Fresno County, California
Universities and colleges affiliated with the Mennonite Church
Schools accredited by the Western Association of Schools and Colleges
Educational institutions established in 1944
1944 establishments in California
Council for Christian Colleges and Universities
Mennonite schools in the United States